Tina!: 50th Anniversary Tour was the eleventh concert tour by singer Tina Turner. It was the first tour by Turner in eight years, following her record-breaking "Twenty Four Seven Tour". The trek marked the singer's 50th year in music—since joining Ike Turner and the Kings of Rhythm in St. Louis, Missouri. In conjunction with the tour, Turner released the compilation album, Tina!. Beginning October 1, 2008, and concluded on May 5, 2009.

With the tour, Turner continued her success in concert sales. The North American leg of the tour played 37 sold-out performances, earning over $47.7 million—becoming one of the biggest tours in the territory for 2008. The success continued for the European leg. Turner played 47 sold-out performances, earning over $84.8 million—becoming the 9th highest earning tour in 2009. The tour was seen by over one million spectators and grossed over $130 million. The concerts received additional accolades, receiving an "Excellence Award" from Live Design Magazine.

Background 

In 2008, Turner made her first appearance on U.S. television for the 50th Grammy Awards since her 2005 album promotional tour. On the show, she performed a medley of "What's Love Got to Do with It" and "Better Be Good to Me" as well as "Proud Mary" with Beyoncé. In the same night, she received an award for her contribution to River: The Joni Letters. Several months later, the singer appeared on The Oprah Winfrey Show with Cher concerning their performance history. This is where Turner announced she was embarking on a world tour. She stated it was the best time for her to go on tour as her peers were performing well on the touring circuit. She continued to say she wanted to do it before it was too late. In sequential, Turner says actress and friend Sophia Loren suggested the singer reconsider retirement because her fans wanted to see her again. Turner was also encouraged to return to the stage following the overwhelming response from her Grammy performance. She further remarks:"I was at the Armani show in Milan just chatting with Sophia Loren. I told her I was taking a break. She said for how long … I said oh, seven years. She said, 'Break over. People want to see you. Get back to work'. […] After [performing at] the Grammys when I got home to Zürich, people would come up to me in the restaurant, in the ladies room, on the street … everywhere. I started getting lots of little slips of paper and napkins with notes from fans. Some of them were so touching about my life, or a song and how it helped them. Each time I kept the note ... and suddenly there was a pile. I called my manager and said, 'It's time!'"

Originally known as "Tina!: Live in Concert", Turner decided to have the tour commemorate her fiftieth year performing on stage. Turner first performed at Club Imperial with Ike Turner and the Kings of Rhythm in 1958 (at the time, Turner was known as "Little Ann"). The tour was sponsored by Amway Global and received early praise from the media and fans. Tour dates were announced in May 2008. While promoting the tour on The Early Show, Turner stated she was ready to return to perform in America and perform in familiar cities. She followed with saying she wanted the tour to start in Missouri since that is where her music career began. Rehearsals for the tour began in late September 2008 at Sprint Center in Kansas City. Production rehearsals began in July 2008 in Hershey, Pennsylvania. The singer gave Access Hollywood an exclusive backstage glimpse at rehearsals and a photoshoot for the tour and upcoming album, Tina!: Her Greatest Hits. The success of the tour was immediate as many shows sold out within minutes. Turner announced additional dates in the United States and release dates for Europe. The tour was a triumph for Turner and continued her success as one of the biggest concert draws in  history. The show was recorded for a live album and DVD release entitled, Tina Live.

Stage 

The stage for the tour was designed by Mark Fisher, who has designed Turner's stages since 1983. The stage itself is a mixture of elements from the singer's previous stages including "The Staircase", "The Claw" and "The Iris". Fisher formed a creative team with Turner's manager Roger Davies, Baz Halpin and Toni Basil to not only design the stage but also the show. The team wanted to feature elements reminiscent of Turner's previous stage productions. The stage measurements were 52.5' deep by 70' wide and weighed 75 tons. The lower tier featured an airlift while the upper tier contained a scissorlift. Due to budget constraints, the staircase was replaced with a small platform that lowered Turner onto the stages. On the upper tier of the stage featured two LED screens that opened resembling the effect used on the Twenty Four Seven Tour. A new stage prop known as "The Cage" was used for the performance of "We Don't Need Another Hero (Thunderdome)".

Concert synopsis 
The show began with an updated version of The Beatles' "Get Back". As the song ends, the curtain rises, revealing Turner on a platform 30' above the stage. The platform lowers as the opening bars for "Steamy Windows" begin to play. The singer quickly transitions into "Typical Male" before she greets the audience, telling them, "I want you to have a good time". This leads into "River Deep – Mountain High" followed by "What You Get Is What You See", where Turner addresses male members of the audience. Turner goes into 'Better Be Good to Me" ending with a sing along with the audience. The song concludes with a dance break featuring "The Ninjas". The performance shows the two dancers fighting with a security guard as the show flows into "Won't Get Fooled Again". Turner returns onstage to perform "Acid Queen". She follows with the performance of her biggest hit "What's Love Got to Do with It?". As the song ends, Turner seeks a call and response from the audience, asking them to say "What's love got to do with it?". "Private Dancer" comes next leading into another dance interlude by The Ninjas. After a costume change, Turner returns onstage to perform "We Don't Need Another Hero (Thunderdome)" as Aunty Entity. The show then proceeds to a 30-minute intermission and returns with a video montage set to "I Don't Wanna Fight".

Turner reappears to perform "Help", "Let's Stay Together", "Undercover Agent for the Blues" and "I Can't Stand the Rain" in an acoustic setting. She returns to her rock prowess with a medley of The Rolling Stones' "Jumping Jack Flash" and "It's Only Rock 'n Roll (But I Like It)". The singer departs the stage once again and her background dancers (known as "Flowers") perform a tango-influenced routine to "007 Theme". The video screens open to reveal "The Iris" and Turner begins to perform "GoldenEye". The singer then goes to the lower tier of the stage to perform "Addicted to Love" and "The Best". Taking a moment to introduce the band, Turner closes the show with her rendition of "Proud Mary". For the encore, Turner returns to perform "Nutbush City Limits" on "The Claw". The cherry picker takes Turner around the audience as she asks them to sing "Nutbush". As Turner ends the night, she performs "Be Tender with Me Baby".

Critical response 
Turner received high praise from both critics and spectators before the tour commenced. For the inaugural concert, Flannery Cashill (The Pitch) wrote that the show was nothing short of "amazing". He elaborates, "After several teasing nice-and-easy near starts, the arena burst into 'Proud Mary' and Turner and her dancers delivered all of the moves – the paddle-wheel arms, the steps, the dips, the various swim strokes, the thrusts of the glorious mane, all of it atop those stilettos." At the concert for the Staples Center, David Wild (Rolling Stone) described the show as "slick and soulful." He continued, "[...] last night was proof positive that the former Anna Mae Bullock still deserves our R-E-S-P-E-C-T. By the [end of the night] the Queen had already touched her royal subjects the old fashioned way – nice and rough."

J. Freedom du Lac (The Washington Post) called the singer "a force to be reckoned with" following her performance at the Verizon Center. He continues, "Turner put on a swaggering, high-voltage rock spectacle in which she easily dispatched any concerns that she's become some sort of museum piece -- even if she was presented on a pedestal: The concert opened with the world's sexiest sexagenarian standing on a platform, some 20 feet above her band." For her concert at the famous Madison Square Garden, Ben Ratliff (The New York Times) called the show "nice and rough". He states, "On solid ground in high heels, she was a ferocious, shaky blur. If Motown choreography intimates the smooth stroke of a cello, hers is the sound of an outboard motor. That strobing physical language, heavily borrowed by Mick Jagger in his youth, was what stuck in your head as you left." These sentiments were shared by Jonathan Cohen (Billboard). He explains, "The point: this woman defies so much conventional wisdom that being in her presence for two-plus hours is a bit of a head trip."

As the tour moved to Europe, the praise continued. After Turner performed at the Lanxess Arena, Tom Horan (The Sunday Telegraph) pens Turner "showed why she is a goddess in Germany." He further says, "If you had to say what that feeling is with Turner, it's a feeling of triumph: I've come this far, I've done it – I'm still standing." Ian Gittins (The Guardian) gave her performance at The O2 Arena four out of five stars. He explains, "Crucially, her voice has not been damaged by its long layoff." His views were shared by Euan Ferguson (The Observer). He says, "It was a moment of perfect triumph: for the grit and feathers of her voice, for its still being there; and for her, not just still being alive, but for doing this."

Broadcasts and recordings 

The tour was chronicled on the CD/DVD released entitled, Tina Live. The recording was filmed on March 21 and 22 at the GelreDome football stadium in the Netherlands. The package includes an audio CD featuring selections from the show and a DVD. The CD/DVD combo was released in September 2009 (in Europe) and October (in the United States) also released on August 5, 2013, a Blu-ray was released in Mexico only with a 720p High Definition transfer but the release cuts four songs including Typical Male, What's Love Got To Do With It, We Don't Need Another Hero & Be Tender With Me Baby.

Set list 
The following set list was obtained from the October 1, 2008, show in Kansas City, Missouri. It does not represent all concerts for the duration of the tour.

"Steamy Windows"
"Typical Male"
"River Deep – Mountain High"
"What You Get Is What You See" (contains elements of "Overnight Sensation")
"Better Be Good to Me"
"Acid Queen" (contains elements of "Won't Get Fooled Again")
"What's Love Got to Do with It?"
"Private Dancer"
"We Don't Need Another Hero (Thunderdome)"
"Help"
"Let's Stay Together"
"Undercover Agent for the Blues"
"I Can't Stand the Rain"
"Jumpin' Jack Flash" / "It's Only Rock 'n Roll (But I Like It)"
"GoldenEye"
"Addicted to Love"
"The Best"
"Proud Mary"
Encore
"Nutbush City Limits"
"Be Tender with Me Baby"

Tour dates

Personnel 

Main
Executive Tour Producer: Roger Davies
Executive Tour Director: Nick Cua
Associate Producer: Toni Basil and Baz Halpin
Tour Coordinator: Bill Buntain and Bonus Management Inc.
Creative Director: Baz Halpin
Lighting Director: Kathy Beer
Musical Director: Ollie Marland
Video Director: Larn  Poland
Choreographer: Toni Basil
Costume Design: Bob Mackie
Lighting Design: Baz Halpin / Sean McKinney
Production Design: Baz Halpin and Mark Fisher
Set Design: Mark Fisher
Video Design: Olivier Goulet (Geodezik)
Production Manager: Malcom Weldon
Project Manager: Nick Evans
Stage Manager: Seth Goldstein
Tour Manager: Donna Parise
Technical Drawings: Technical Drawings
Ticket Coordinator: Donna Parise
Production Assistant: Dori Venza
Production Consultant: Jake Berry (Higher Fader)

Crew
Head Carpenter: Timothy Woo
Carpenter: Alan Doyle, Robert Gallegos, Jacque Richard, Colin Paynter, Daniel Witmyer and Christopher Woo
Engineer: Graham Holwill
Monitor Engineer: J. Summers
Monitor Tech: Richard Schonedel
FOH Sound Engineer: David Natale
Lighting Crew Chief: Ian Tucker / Sean McKinney
Lighting Crew: Thomas Bider, Doug Eder, Andrew David Johnson, Mike Merle and Steven "Six" Schwind
Head Rigger: Bart Durbin
Rigger:Stephen Chambers and Paul Ingswergen
Motion Control: Jacque Richard
Video Content: Nick Morris
Video Consultant: Bob Brigham
Video Playback: David Boisvert
Camera Operator: Tracy Calderon, Nick Ruocco, Nicholas Weldon and Shawn Worlow
Audio Technician: Sean Baca, Jeremy Bolton and Joshua Weibel
Drum Technician: Gary Grimm
Guitar Technician: John Ciasulli
Keyboard Technician: Glenn Erwin
Programmer: Glenn Erwin
Assistant (Choreography): Nina Flagg, Marissa Labog and Katie Orr
Assistant (Costume Design): Joe McFate
Wardrobe: Helen "Mel" Dykes, Julie Frankham, Bonnie Flesland and Jennifer Jacobs
Footwear: Empori Armani, Giorgio Armani, Manolo Blahnick and Christian Louboutin
Hair Design/Styling ; Serena Radaelli
Hair: Arthur John
Make Up: Yvette Beebe
Chauffeur: Jose Gomez
Chef: Didier Uebersax
Dressing Room: Lyndsey Burns
Executive Assistant: Rhonda Graam
Personal Assistant: Julie Frankham
Personal Wellness: Jarod Chapman
Director of Security: Bernard "Bernd" Belka
Venue Security Director: Anthony Robinson

Band
Guitar: Laurie Wisefield and John Miles
Bass: Warren McRae
Drums: Jack Bruno
Percussions: Euge Groove
Keyboards: Ollie Marland and Joel Campbell
Saxophone: Euge Groove
Backing vocals: Joel Campbell, Stacy Campbell, Lisa Fischer, John Miles, Ollie Marland and Laurie Wisefield
Dancers ("Flowers"): Djeneba Aduayom, Solange Guenier, Ferly Prado and Clare Turton
Ninjas: Philip Sahagún, Jesse "Justice" Smith, Danny Sre and Xin Wuku

Production
Airfreight: Joe Allen (Rock–It Cargo USA Inc.)
Buses: Trent Hemphill and Mark Larson (Hemphill Bros Coach)
Bus Driver: Tim Brannon, Andy Clark, Bennet Bee Haley, Terry Ford, Ty Saunders and Allen Sowersby
Trucking (United States): Bob Higgins (Artisan)
Trucking (Europe): Mark Guterres (Transam Trucking Ltd)
Truck Driver: Bob Bramel, Carl Hereford, Cody Chase, Danny Frederick, Earl Edwards, Ed Lester, James Honke, Jeff Swearingen, Jeremy Daniel, John Thompson, Kenny Kid, Kyle Haveraneck, Paul Arnold, Randy Carlisle, Ray Bidler, Robert Jackson, Ron Templin and Steve "Tex" Sallee
Audio: Thomas Huntington
Electrics: John Zajonc(Legacy Power)
Lighting: Micky Curbishly (PRG Lighting)
Pyrotechnics: Lorenzo Cornacchia (Pyrotek)
Radio: Jeremy Schilling (Road Radios)
Rigging: John Fletcher and Bob Savage (Five Points Rigging)
Set Construction: Adam Davis, James "Winky" Fairoth and Michael Tait (Tait Towers)
Sound: Greg Hall (Clair Brothers Audio)

Business
Accountant: Bill Buntain
Business Management: Nancy Chapman, Kevin Carretta and Patty DeFrancesco (Chapman, Bird and Gray)
Immigration: David King (TCG New York and London)
Insurance: Bob Taylor and Paul Twomey (Robertson Taylor Insurance Brokers Ltd)
 Legal (United States): Carla Good, Gregg Harrison, Don Passman and Gene Salomon (Gang, Tyre, Ramer & Brown Inc.)
Legal (Europe): Evan Lawson (Michael Simkins LLP)
Management: Roger Davies, Lisa Garrett, Steven Manzano, Delwyn Rees and Irene Taylor
Promotion (North America): Doug Clouse, Paul Gongaware, Jay Lotz, John Meglan, Amy Morrison and Jon States (Concerts West/AEG Live)
Promotion (Europe): Doris Dixon, Ben Martin, Barrie Marshall and Jenny Marshall (Marshall Arts Ltd)
Publicity (United States): Michele Schweitzer (M–Relations LLC)
Publicity (Europe): Bernard Doherty (LD Communications)
Record Company (United States): Capitol Records
Record Company (Europe): EMI
Travel: Ken Bruce (Bruvion Travel/Concierge Services), Jason Couvillion, Scott Patton, John Rukavina and Jeff Torres
Travel (Private Charter): Kim Scolari (Jet Productions Inc)
Tour Sponsor: Amway Global, Steve Lieberman, Whitten Pell and Cody Lieberman
Communications: Doug Stringer (Casbah)
Itineraries: Knowhere Itineraries
Merchandising: Tom Donnell (Bravado International Group)
Tour Passes: Cube Services Inc.
Art Direction: Jeri Heiden
Photography: Andrew Macpherson

See also 
 List of highest-grossing concert tours

Notes

References

External links 
Tina: 50th Anniversary Tour 2008-09

Tina Turner concert tours
2008 concert tours
2009 concert tours